Rokometni klub Gorenje Velenje, commonly referred to as RK Gorenje Velenje or simply Gorenje, is a Slovenian handball club from Velenje that competes in the Slovenian First League, the top tier of Slovenian handball. They play their games at the Red Hall. The club has won four Slovenian Championships and three Slovenian cup titles. Gorenje also participated in the EHF competitions for many seasons, including the EHF Cup, the EHF Cup Winners' Cup, and the EHF Champions League. Together with Celje, they are the only club that have participated in every season of the Slovenian First League since its formation in 1991.

The club was known as RK Šoštanj and ŠRK Velenje in the past.

History

1958–1972: Beginning of handball in Šoštanj
In 1958, when section of handball was established at TVD Partizan, organized handball started to develop in the town of Šoštanj.

Handball was pioneered by young men in local schools with the help of some basketball players. The first pioneers were Miligoj Jarnovič, Pavle Bukovac, and Jože Pukmajster. In the beginning, the club participated in the Celje regional league. In 1964–65, they qualified to the Styrian regional league and a year later, Šoštanj achieved its biggest success and qualified to the Yugoslav republic league and were never relegated. In the 1970s, team handball developed and was top event in the region, on average match there were about 1,000 spectators.

1973–1982
15 years after the club was established it became Republic Champions, after finishing first in Slovenian republic league of Yugoslavia in the 1972–73 season.

Competing in the II. Yugoslav handball league (they qualified through the republic league) was a great honor and commitment to hard work. But the team dropped out of the II. Yugoslav league and returned to the republic league after just one season, possibly due to lack of experience, resources and other factors.

1983–1991
After playing in the interrepublic league from 1981 to 1984, team handball players from Šoštanj qualified, for the first time since the 1973–74 season, to the II. Yugoslav handball league. Although they had some financial and management problems (they replaced three coaches), the team from Šoštanj finished fifth in 1990.

Although the name RK Šoštanj was known across Slovenia and former Yugoslavia, the club decided to change their name to ŠRK Velenje (Šaleški rokometni klub Velenje). This was because all games in previous years were played in Velenje at the Red Hall and because most of the players were locals from Velenje. In that season, ŠRK Velenje finished third. The first two places lead to qualifications to the First Yugoslav League, and in their last match they lost that qualifying position. This has been called the biggest accomplishment in 30 years of the club's history.

1992–2002
After their most successful season, when the club was at the near top of the Second Yugoslav League, Slovenia declared its independence. In the 1991–92 season, handball clubs of the newly established country played their own championship. As a result, competing in the European Handball Federation (EHF) competitions became possible. In their first season, Gorenje performed below expectations and finished fifth.

After the main part of the competition in the 1993–94 season, Gorenje finished in third place. In the play-offs they won against RK Prevent and then RK Drava Ptuj in the finals; RK Celje was a better opponent twice, however, as the runners-up of the league, Gorenje qualified to the EHF competitions, where they reached the semi-finals of the EHF Cup.

2002–2003
The 2002–03 season was historic in many ways for Gorenje. The club was at the top of the Slovenian handball competitions all these years and had some respectable achievements in Europe, but the team from Velenje never made it quite to the top in either competition. But in the Slovenian cup finals, RK Gorenje Velenje won against Prule 67 and claimed their first title in Slovenia since its independence in 1991.

This success was a turning point for the club, because it had finally secured its position in Slovenia and in Europe. The President of RK Gorenje, Franc Plaskan retired, and was replaced by Janez Živko.

2003–2004
2003–04 was yet another successful season for Gorenje. Top performance and great play-offs in the EHF Cup Winners' Cup, where they won twice with minimum advantage, didn't disappoint the ambitious club or its supporters. Despite losses in the national championship, they reached the semi-finals in the Cup Winners' Cup. Their first match resulted in a narrow loss to Valladolid. However, in the Slovenian playoffs of the 1. A league, they made it to the finals with injuries and a downsized team. During this match, they were finally defeated by Celje.

2004–2005
Gorenje was paying the tax on injuries, which was a side effect of premier season in the Champions League. After some lost matches, they entered the playoffs in third position. But they had no match in playoffs and went straight to the finals. This was a historic finals again. The match against Celje ended only after four add-ons and shooting 7m throws. Celje won by 51–48. In the second match they were simply better.

In the Champions League, Velenje experienced a new level of the game. A poor start eliminated them from the 1/8 finals so they continued their season in the Cup Winners' Cup where they reached the quarter-finals and narrowly lost to Izvidač Ljubovski.

2005–2006
In the 2005–06 season, Gorenje reached the Round of 16 in the 2005–06 EHF Champions League, where they were eliminated by French side Montpellier Handball.

In a domestic championship, the team was placed second after the regular part of the season, but finished the season in third place after defeats against RK Trimo Trebnje, RK Koper and RK Gold Club. After two years in the EHF Champions League they returned to the EHF Cup Winners' Cup.

2007–2009
Between 2006 and 2009 some major changes were made at RK Gorenje Velenje. In 2007, Gorenje hired a new promising coach, Ivica Obrvan, with a four-year contract and mission to bring home the first championship title before club's forthcoming 50th anniversary. That year they finished second. In the following season, they slipped to third place, with Koper in second and Celje claiming the title again. However, the season that will go down to history was 2008–09, on club's 50th anniversary, when Gorenje won their first title in independent Slovenia. They joined the exclusive club of just three handball clubs that managed this in a brief history since 1991 to 2009. In addition, Gorenje reached the finals in the EHF Cup, where they lost to Gumbersbach.

2009–2010
In the 2009–10 season, Gorenje finished in second place in the Slovenian First League, just one point behind the league winners Celje. The team from Velenje also participated for the fourth time in the EHF Champions league during the season. After qualifying to the European Top 16, they were defeated by Spanish side BM Ciudad Real.

2010–2011
After 19 victories in a row during the regular part of the Slovenian First League, Gorenje was leading by five points with ten rounds to go. However, things went downhill from there and the team's season rivals, Cimos Koper, caught up and won the title.

Through the season, Gorenje and Cimos played three matches. Gorenje won the first match (27–24) and Cimos won the other two (28–25 and 26–21). That meant that Gorenje had to win the fourth and final match with a minimum of five goals difference in order to win the championship. The last match of the season was then played in Velenje, where Koper won 34–23.

The team also competed in the EHF Cup as well where Frisch Auf Göppingen knocked them out in the quarter-finals. The German team won the first match 33–20, even though Gorenje won the second match 26–22.

Team

Current squad
Squad for the 2022–23 season

Goalkeepers
1  Matevž Skok
 12  Aljaž Verboten
 32  Emir Taletović
Right wingers
8  Ibrahim Haseljić
 10  Urban Pipp
 11  Kenan Pajt
Left wingers
 24  Tilen Sokolič
 25  Matic Verdinek
Line players
 20  Jernej Drobež
 22  David Kovačič
 35  Branko Predović

Left backs
 23  Malik Mlivić
 33  Enej Slatinek Jovičić
 34  Tarik Mlivić
Central backs
9  Domen Tajnik
 27  Peter Šiško
 58  Nejc Hriberšek
Right backs
 19  Marin Hebar
 28  Timotej Grmšek

Club supporters
Gorenje Velenje supporters are called Šaleški graščaki, formed in 1994. Their biggest rivals are Florijani, supporters of RK Celje.

Sponsorship
The main sponsor of the club is the manufacturer of household appliances Gorenje, which is also based in Velenje.

Arena
RK Gorenje's home matches are played at the Red Hall, which has a capacity for 2,500 spectators. Built in 1974, the venue was refurbished in 1989, 1994, and again in 2004 for the 2004 European Men's Handball Championship.

Rivalry
Gorenje's biggest rivals are RK Celje. The matches between the two sides are known as the "Savinja and Šalek Valley derby".

Media
As the first and only handball club in Slovenia, RK Gorenje produced a television show RKG Pressing and a magazine called 9ka.

Honours

Slovenia
Slovenian Championship
Winners (4): 2008–09, 2011–12, 2012–13, 2020–21
Runners-up (12): 1993–94, 1995–96, 2003–04, 2004–05, 2006–07, 2009–10, 2010–11, 2013–14, 2014–15, 2015–16, 2016–17, 2018–19
Third place (7): 1994–95, 2001–02, 2002–03, 2005–06, 2007–08, 2017–18, 2021–22

Slovenian Cup
Winners (3): 2002–03, 2018–19, 2021–22
Runners-up (8): 1994–95, 1996–97, 1997–98, 2000–01, 2006–07, 2010–11, 2012–13, 2014–15

Slovenian Supercup
Winners (4): 2009, 2011, 2012, 2022
Runners-up (3): 2007, 2015, 2019

Yugoslavia
Under the Yugoslav Handball Federation there were many levels of competition in handball, including the First and Second Yugoslav Leagues, the Interrepublic and Republic Leagues, and regional competitions.

Regional, republic and interrepublic league
1964–65: Regional league – Celje, 1st place
1968–69: II. Republic League (Styria division), 1st place
1972–73: I. Republic League, 1st place
1980–81: I. Republic League, 1st place
1983–84: Interrepublic league, 3rd place
1984–85: I. Republic League, 1st place
1988–89: I. Republic League, 1st place

II. Yugoslav handball league
1990–91, 3rd place

References

External links
 

Handball clubs established in 1958
Slovenian handball clubs
Sport in Velenje
1958 establishments in Slovenia
Gorenje